"Come On Down" is a 2001 single recorded by American singer and songwriter Crystal Waters, produced by Orlando Ortiz and co-written with Waters and Robert A. Israel.

Association with The Price Is Right
The track, her first release for Strictly Rhythm Records, samples the theme song to the American game show The Price Is Right, whose music was written and produced by Israel for his in-house company Score Productions. The show's parent company Pearson Television (now part of FremantleMedia) gave its blessing to let Waters use the theme song, and as such received publishing rights and credits on the song. The single also marked the first time that lyrics were added to The Price Is Right theme song and the first song based on a television theme song (and the first to come from a game show) to reach number 1 on the Billboard Hot Dance Club Play chart the week of December 29, 2001.

Official versions
 CD maxi (US)
"Come On Down" (Live Element Radio Mix) – 3:40
"Come On Down" (The Tamperer Radio Mix) – 3:33
"Come On Down" (DJ Dome's Radio Mix) – 3:49
"Come On Down" (Live Element Extended Club Mix) – 8:18
"Come On Down" (Tamperer Club Mix) – 6:30
"Come On Down" (DJ Dome Original Mix) – 6:23
"Come On Down" (Just Keith Sub Dub Mix) – 7:44
"Come On Down" (Silent Nick Dub Mix) – 9:03

References

2001 singles
Crystal Waters songs
2001 songs
Television game show theme songs
The Price Is Right
Electronic songs